Major Alexis Charles Doxat,  (9 April 1867 – 29 November 1942) was an English recipient of the Victoria Cross, the highest and most prestigious award for gallantry in the face of the enemy that can be awarded to British and Commonwealth forces.

Background
Doxat was educated at Norwich School before going on to Philberd's, Maidenhead. He joined the 7th Militia Battalion The Rifle Brigade in 1892.

Following the outbreak of the Second Boer War in 1899, Doxat was commissioned a Lieutenant in the Yorkshire Dragoons within the 3rd Battalion, Imperial Yeomanry on 3 January 1900.

Details
Doxat was 33 years old, and a lieutenant in the 3rd Battalion, Imperial Yeomanry during the Second Boer War when the following deed took place on 20 October 1900 near Zeerust, South Africa, for which he was awarded the VC:

He received the Victoria Cross from King Edward VII, in person, during an investiture at St James's Palace 17 December 1901.

Doxat later achieved the rank of major in the King's Royal Rifle Corps in World War I.

His medals are now on display at the Lord Ashcroft Gallery in the Imperial War Museum, London He is buried in Cambridge City Cemetery.

References

Monuments to Courage (David Harvey, 1999)
The Register of the Victoria Cross (This England, 1997)
Victoria Crosses of the Anglo-Boer War (Ian Uys, 2000)

Bibliography

External links

Location of grave and VC medal (Cambridgeshire)

1867 births
1942 deaths
King's Royal Rifle Corps officers
Second Boer War recipients of the Victoria Cross
British recipients of the Victoria Cross
People from Surbiton
People educated at Norwich School
British Army personnel of the Second Boer War
British Army personnel of World War I
Imperial Yeomanry officers
British Army recipients of the Victoria Cross
Burials at the Cambridge City Cemetery
Military personnel from Surrey